Stewarts Creek Wildlife Management Area is a  Wildlife Management Area (WMA) in Carroll County, Virginia. Five sections of streams totaling , including the headwaters of both the North and South forks of Stewarts Creek, lie within the area's boundaries; many of these contain populations of brook trout, and are bordered by thickets of rhododendrons. Most of the area is wooded, mainly with tulip poplar, yellow birch, oak, and hickory.

Stewarts Creek WMA is owned and maintained by the Virginia Department of Game and Inland Fisheries. The area is open to the public for hunting, trapping, fishing, hiking, horseback riding, and primitive camping. Access for persons 17 years of age or older requires a valid hunting or fishing permit, or a WMA access permit.

See also
 List of Virginia Wildlife Management Areas

References

External links
Virginia Department of Game and Inland Fisheries: Stewarts Creek Wildlife Management Area

Wildlife management areas of Virginia
Protected areas of Carroll County, Virginia